Eleanor of Castile (after 1363 – 1415/1416) was Queen of Navarre by marriage to King Charles III of Navarre. She acted as regent of Navarre during the absence of her spouse in France in 1397–1398, 1403–1406 and 1409–1411.

Biography

Early life
She was the daughter of King Henry II of Castile and his wife Juana Manuel of Castile, who was descended from a cadet branch of the Castilian royal house. Eleanor was a member of the House of Trastámara.

Eleanor was involved with plans to marry King Ferdinand I of Portugal in 1371, however he refused the match as he had secretly married the noblewoman Leonor Telles de Menezes.

She was betrothed in Burgos in 1373 to Prince Charles, the heir of King Charles II of Navarre. The couple was married at Soria in May 1375. A testament dated at Burgos on 29 May 1374 shows that King Henry II bequeathed property to his daughter Eleanor as a part of her dowry.

The Years in Castile
The marriage of Charles and Eleanor was marked by a number of unusual marital disputes. In 1388, Eleanor asked at a meeting between her husband and her brother John I of Castile for permission to retire for some time to her homeland of Castile in order to recover from an illness caught in Navarre. She believed this course of action would be best for her health. The two young daughters in her care at the time went with her. During their absence from Navarre, Eleanor and her children resided in Valladolid. By 1390, Eleanor bore two more daughters to Charles, and two years later, her husband requested her to return to Navarre because both of them needed to be crowned King and Queen of Navarre upon the death of her father-in-law King Charles II. Eleanor's brother King John supported the request of Charles III. Eleanor did not consent, claiming that she was ill-treated in Navarre and believed members of the Navarrese nobility wished to poison her. As a result, Eleanor remained in Castile while her husband was crowned in February 1390 in Pamplona. By the end of the 1390s, Eleanor had born her husband six daughters, all of whom survived infancy, but no sons. For this reason, Eleanor handed her oldest daughter Joanna over to Charles III to be groomed for her future role as ruler of the Kingdom of Navarre.

On 9 October 1390, Eleanor's brother John died and was succeeded by his minor son Henry as king of Castile. Charles then requested Eleanor's return to Navarre again, but she refused once more. Eleanor opposed her nephew Henry's accession and she formed the League of Lillo along with her illegitimate half-brother Fadrique and her cousin Pedro. King Henry opposed the League, besieged Eleanor in her castle at Roa around mid-1394, and obliged her to return to her husband in February 1395.

Queen of Navarre
Eleanor became very involved in the political life of Navarre upon her return. Her relationship with her husband improved, and she bore him the long-awaited sons Charles and Louis. Both died young, however. On 3 June 1403, her coronation as Queen of Navarre took place in Pamplona. Upon several occasions when Charles stayed in France, Eleanor took to the role of regent. She also helped to maintain good relations between Navarre and Castile. As a result of these good relations, members of the Castillian nobility, including the Duke of Benavente and members of the powerful families of Dávalos, Mendoza and Zuñiga, settled in Navarre.

Upon the couple's absences, their daughter Joanna acted as regent, as she was heiress to the kingdom. Joanna died in 1413 without issue and in the lifetime of both her parents, therefore the succession turned to their second daughter Blanche, who would eventually succeed as Queen of Navarre upon Charles' death.

There is confusion surrounding Eleanor's death. She is believed to have died at Olite on 27 February 1415 or at Pamplona 5 March 1416. Her husband died in 1425, and they were buried together at Pamplona in the Cathedral of Santa María la Real.

Issue

Eleanor and Charles had eight children, five of which lived to adulthood:
Joanna (1382–1413), married John I, Count of Foix, no issue.
Blanche (1385-1441), married John II of Aragon, became Queen of Navarre and had issue.
Maria (1388–1406), died unmarried and childless.
Margaret (1390–1403), died young
Beatrice (1392–1412), married to James II, Count of La Marche, and had issue.
Isabella (1395–1435), married in 1419 to John IV of Armagnac, had issue; they were great-great grandparents of King Henry IV of France.
Charles (1397–1402), Prince of Viana, died young
Louis (1402), Prince of Viana, died young

References

Sources
 

14th-century births
1416 deaths
Daughters of kings
Year of birth unknown
Year of death uncertain
Eleanor
Navarrese royal consorts
14th-century nobility from the Kingdom of Navarre
15th-century nobility from the Kingdom of Navarre
Countesses of Évreux
Consorts of Montpellier
Castilian infantas
Burials at Pamplona Cathedral
15th-century women rulers